Jang Yoo-sang is a South Korean actor and model. He is known for his lead roles in One Night Only, Set Play, and Stay with Me. He is also known for his supporting roles in dramas such as Exo Next Door and Queen of Mystery 2. He also appeared in Love with Flaws as Choi Ho-dol.

Filmography

Television

Film

References

External links 
 
 

1991 births
Living people
People from Seoul
Male actors from Seoul
Models from Seoul
21st-century South Korean male actors
South Korean male models
South Korean male television actors
South Korean male film actors
South Korean male web series actors